Seffernsville is a community in the Canadian province of Nova Scotia, located in the Lunenburg Municipal District in Lunenburg County.

References
Seffernsville on Destination Nova Scotia

Communities in Lunenburg County, Nova Scotia
General Service Areas in Nova Scotia